La Invasión de los Blátidos is the first album by Cuca, a Mexican hard rock group originally from Guadalajara, Jalisco. It was recorded in 1991.

Track listing

Singles and videos  
 "Cara de Pizza"
 "El Son del Dolor"

1992 debut albums
Cuca (band) albums